The Guardian Championship is a tournament on the Epson Tour, the LPGA's developmental tour. It has been a part of the tour's schedule since 2017. It is held at Capitol Hill Golf Club in Prattville, Alabama.

Title sponsor is the Guardian Credit Union, based in Montgomery, Alabama.

The 2020 tournament was cancelled due to the COVID-19 pandemic.

Winners

References

External links

Coverage on Epson Tour website

Symetra Tour events
Golf in Alabama
Recurring sporting events established in 2017
2017 establishments in Alabama